Future Tactics: The Uprising is a turn based tactical shooter video game by Zed Two. Once known as Pillage, this turn based shooter was stuck in development for a number of years before being picked up by Crave for a US release, followed shortly by JoWood for a European release. It plays a lot like the Worms 3D games and has a story penned by Paul Rose. The game features a geo-mod system in which almost anything can be destroyed, leaving battlefields scarred by craters.

It was released on PlayStation 2, Xbox, GameCube and Windows. A Gizmondo version was planned, but cancelled after Tiger Telematics went bankrupt.

The plot of the game revolves around Low, his sister Pepper, and any other survivors they can find, trying to rid the world of the mysterious and malevolent "creatures" that are slowly taking over the planet.

Gameplay
Gameplay always involves a set of two teams. One team moves all its players, and then the other. The characters fire by aiming at a target and then matching two lines for the precise firing zone. Depending on the upgrades received, the player characters may also zoom in or add an extra boost of power before firing. Firing can destroy parts of the environment, which is one of the selling points of the game. Character progression is based on experience attained from killing enemies, or finding hidden items in the environment. Gaining a level lets the player pick a new ability or boost for the character.

Although not a new game plus in the traditional sense, if a player continues the game after finishing all 19 episodes, a change to the turn mechanics in combat is made. Instead of an entire team moving at a time, only one character may move before it becomes the other team's turn. Turns are then rotated throughout the characters.

References

External links
 Future Tactics: The Uprising for GameCube | PS2 | Xbox | Gizmondo at IGN

2004 video games
Cancelled Gizmondo games
Crave Entertainment games
GameCube games
Multiplayer and single-player video games
PlayStation 2 games
Tactical shooter video games
Turn-based strategy video games
Video games developed in the United Kingdom
Video games scored by Tim Follin
Windows games
Xbox games
JoWooD Entertainment games